Kataka Mountain is located on the border of Alberta and British Columbia. It was named in 1916 by Morrison P. Bridgland.

See also
 List of peaks on the Alberta–British Columbia border
 Mountains of Alberta
 Mountains of British Columbia

References

Kataka Mountain
Kataka Mountain
Canadian Rockies